Saint Ildefonsus is a 1609 painting by El Greco. It and his Saint Peter were both painted for the Church of San Vicente, Toledo. It has also previously been misidentified as Pope Eugene I or saint Blaise. It is now in the Real Monasterio de San Lorenzo de El Escorial.

Ildefonsus is shown in a chasuble, pallium and mitre, holding a bishop's staff and an open book. The full robes emphasise the model's anatomy, showing Michelangelo's influence on El Greco.

Bibliography 
  ÁLVAREZ LOPERA, José, El Greco, Madrid, Arlanza, 2005, Biblioteca «Descubrir el Arte», (colección «Grandes maestros»). .
  SCHOLZ-HÄNSEL, Michael, El Greco, Colonia, Taschen, 2003. .

External links 
  ArteHistoria.com. «San Ildefonso». [Consulta: 09.01.2011].

1609 paintings
Paintings by El Greco
Books in art
Spanish royal collection
Paintings in the collection of El Escorial
Ildefonsus